Carlo Brandelli is an artist born in England. He was named Menswear Designer of the Year by the British Fashion Council in 2005.

Menswear career 
His first work was Squire, launched in 1991, in which Brandelli merged the ideas of art, architecture and design by introducing one of the first 'creative director" roles in the fashion industry. It was the first project of its kind, bringing together many different types of design esthetics in a concept space in Mayfair that embodied the beginnings of Cool Britannia. The gallery displayed design collections in the same space as classic pop art artworks by artists such as Allen Jones and Bridget Riley. Squire's early collaborators, clients and admirers included Alexander McQueen (who wore Squire's designs to his first historic Givenchy interview), Massive Attack, Kate Moss, Helmut Lang, and most of the iconoclasts of the design, music and style scene. Nick Knight and Peter Saville (photographer and art director, respectively) were the first collaborators.

Squire challenged the boundaries between design, fashion, and art, pioneering a more open and broad spectrum of ways designers could work within other creative disciplines and media. Brandelli initially specialized in tailoring, combining traditional Savile Row craftsmanship with modern design principles.

It was during this time that Brandelli began working on unstructured tailoring. in 1999, the first ideas emerged. Unstructured tailoring changed the way tailoring was seen. Until then, fully structured, heavy suits with interlinings and horsehair chest pieces were the norm. Brandelli wanted to design suits that were completely unlined and without internal structure, allowing the cut to dictate the outer shape. The designs were lighter and more comfortable. He christened his work "Unstructured Tailoring" and the menswear industry has adopted this term to define all designs of this type.

During this time, Brandelli worked as a freelance menswear designer for Burberry and Valentino in Japan.

After five years of concept work at Squire and having accomplished everything he set out to do for the project, Kilgour unexpectedly approached Brandelli in 2003 to become creative director. This project provided an opportunity to define and develop all the elements of a new Kilgour, a different kind of creative and artistic work. Brandelli was tasked with creating a modern, hybrid menswear brand that combined the craftsmanship and heritage of Savile Row with all aspects of modern, contemporary design. Brandelli conceived the brand's concept, controlled all designs, and created the flagship spaces and campaigns. The project was both critically and commercially very successful. Brandelli received numerous awards, including the title of Most Stylish Man by British GQ, and in 2005 was named Menswear Designer of the Year by the British Fashion Council, the highest award available in the field. in 2008, Kilgour changed hands shortly before Brandelli's 2009 Paris catwalk debut. Brandelli promptly resigned, leaving the brand he founded as Kilgour. In 2013, Kilgour changed hands again and the new owners approached Brandelli to resume his role as freelance creative director, with a mission to reposition Kilgour as an "International Contemporary Bespoke Brand and Tailor".

Artist Career 
In 2009, Brandelli founded his own studio, where he works with private clients as a design consultant and creative director. The studio also focuses on artistic works. His first solo sculpture exhibition 'Permanence 2010 - Travertine, Marble, Stone and Gold' opened on June 25, 2010 at the RCM Galerie in Paris. In October 2010, some of Permanence's works were also shown at the Art Elysees Contemporary Art Fair in Paris together with RCM, a crossover gallery specializing in art/design.

In October 2011, several works were produced in collaboration with American contemporary artist Matthew Brannon at Casey Kaplan Gallery in New York and shown at London's Frieze Art Fair. Brandelli made a series of abstract mantle sculptures in rubber-coated cotton as part of Matthew's work with Casey Kaplan. Matthew Brannon's solo exhibition opened at Casey Kaplan Gallery in New York in October 2011, and Brandelli collaborated on several collaborative works acquired by the prestigious Contemporary Rennie Collection at Wing Sang Gallery in Vancouver.

For 2013, several glass works were produced in Murano as part of a 'floating series' and all pieces were acquired from a private collection. A second series entitled 'Left Glass' was produced in 2016 and exhibited at the RCM Galerie in Paris.

Brandelli was selected as a guest designer for the prestigious Pitti Uomo show in 2015, where he displayed a 6-square-meter installation of colored glass in the courtyard of the Medici Palazzo in Florence that was part of his presentation of menswear.

in 2017, Brandelli was one of the few menswear designers selected to be exhibited in MOMA Museum Of Modern Art New York's groundbreaking exhibition ' Is fashion Modern ', where important designs from the last 100 years were selected for the major exhibition. Brandelli's design Unstructured suit for tailoring was selected.

Brandelli regularly lectures on design and is a recognized commentator on the international design scene.

References

 https://web.archive.org/web/20150622204000/http://www.wallpaper.com/fashion/carlo-brandelli-illuminates-the-internal-courtyard-of-florences-medici-palace-for-pitti/9069
 The Daily Telegraph
 http://www.wallpaper.com/fashion/carlo-brandelli-constructs-a-new-flagship-and-vision-for-kilgour-on-savile-row/7531
 http://showstudio.com/contributor/carlo_brandelli
 http://www.wallpaper.com//gallery/art/permanence-exhibition-by-carlo-brandelli-paris/17051944
 http://032c.com/2011/carlo-brandelli’s-objects-of-devotion/
 http://howtospendit.ft.com/style/6080-carlo-brandelli-talks-personal-style
 The Daily Telegraph 
 http://www.vogue.co.uk/blogs/the-culture-edit/2011/11/24/carlo-brandelli---new-york-exhibition 
 https://www.standard.co.uk/news/standard-pictures/gq-awards-2005-7334658.html?action=gallery&ino=10 
 http://www.heart.co.uk/photos/gq-men-style/gq-men-style-1/
 http://www.vogue.co.uk/news/2005/11/11/the-british-fashion-awards-2005
 http://www.style.com/slideshows/slideshows/trends/mens/2015/1-january/influential-people-mens-fashion/slides/20
 https://web.archive.org/web/20150703003350/http://www.gq-magazine.co.uk/style/articles/2015-06/19/carlo-brandelli-kilgour-installation-pitti-uomo-medici-palazzo
 http://www.vogue.co.uk/news/2010/06/25/carlo-brandelli-opens-sculpture-exhibition
 http://www.style.com/fashion-shows/fall-2015-menswear/kilgour

External links

Year of birth missing (living people)
Living people
British fashion designers
Menswear designers
British people of Italian descent